Hannover-Land II is an electoral constituency (German: Wahlkreis) represented in the Bundestag. It elects one member via first-past-the-post voting. Under the current constituency numbering system, it is designated as constituency 47. It is located in central Lower Saxony, comprising the southern part of the Hanover Region.

Hannover-Land II was created for the inaugural 1949 federal election. Since 2005, it has been represented by Matthias Miersch of the Social Democratic Party (SPD).

Geography
Hannover-Land II is located in central Lower Saxony. As of the 2021 federal election, it comprises the northern part of the Hanover Region, specifically the municipalities of Barsinghausen, Gehrden, Hemmingen, Laatzen, Lehrte, Pattensen, Ronnenberg, Seelze, Sehnde, Springe, Uetze, and Wennigsen.

History
Hannover-Land II was created in 1949, then known as Hannover-Land. In the 1965 through 1976 elections, it was named Hannover III. It acquired its current name in the 1980 election. In the inaugural Bundestag election, it was Lower Saxony constituency 20 in the numbering system. From 1953 through 1961, it was number 42. From 1965 through 1976, it was number 38. From 1980 through 1998, it was number 42. In the 2002 and 2005 elections, it was number 47. In the 2009 election, it was number 48. Since the 2013 election, it has been number 47.

Originally, the constituency comprised the entirety of the now-abolished Landkreis Hannover district, as well as the municipalities of Lehrte and Sehnde from the Burgdorf district. In the 1965 through 1976 elections, it comprised the Landkreis Hannover district and the quarters of Döhren, Wülfel, Kirchrode, Bemerode, and Wülferode from the independent city of Hanover. After administrative boundaries were redrawn, from the 1980 election the constituency comprised the municipalities of Barsinghausen, Gehrden, Hemmingen, Laatzen, Pattensen, Ronnenberg, Seelze, Sehnde, Springe, Wennigsen, and Wunstorf from the Landkreis Hannover district. In the 2002 election, it lost Wunstorf while gaining Uetze und Lehrte.

Members
The constituency has been held by the Social Democratic Party (SPD) during all but three Bundestag terms since its creation. Its first representative was Hans Jahn of the SPD, who served from 1949 to 1961. He was succeeded by fellow SPD member Werner Marquardt, who served until 1976. The SPD's Günter Kiehm served a single term before the constituency was won by Herbert Lattmann of the CDU in 1983. Kiehm regained it in 1987, but Lattmann was elected in 1990 and again in 1994. In 1998, Horst Schild of the SPD won the constituency and served two terms as representative. He was succeeded in 2005 by Matthias Miersch, who was re-elected in 2009, 2013, 2017, and 2021.

Election results

2021 election

2017 election

2013 election

2009 election

References

Federal electoral districts in Lower Saxony
Hanover
1949 establishments in West Germany
Constituencies established in 1949